National Highway 73 (NH 73) is a National Highway in India. This highway runs in the Indian state of Karnataka. It starts from sea port city of Mangaluru ( Mangalore) and ends at Tumakuru. Even though named as national highway the road is narrow and prone to landslips and falling of trees in Charmady ghat section of Western ghats. This highway was previously part of national highways 48, 234 and 206 but subsequent to rationalisation of national highway numbers of India by Gazette notification on 5 March 2010 it was changed to National Highway 73.

Route 

The national highway 73 ( NH-73) connects towns of Mangaluru, Bantwal Beltangady, Ujire, Charmadi, Kottigehara, Mudigere, Belur, Halebeedu, Javagal, Banavara, Arasikere, Tiptur, Kibbanahalli, Nittur, Gubbi and Tumakuru in the state of Karnataka.

Junctions  
 
  Terminal near Mangaluru.
  near Bantval
  near Mudigere
  near Belur
  near Banavara
  near Kibbanahalli
  Terminal near Tumakuru.

See also 
 List of National Highways in India
 List of National Highways in India by state
 National Highways Development Project
 List of National Highways in Karnataka
 Ghat Roads

References

External links 
 NH 73 on OpenStreetMap

National highways in India
National Highways in Karnataka
Transport in Mangalore
Transport in Tumkur